Delhi Technological University (DTU), formerly known as the Delhi College of Engineering (DCE) is a state university in Rohini, Delhi, India. It was established in 1941 as Delhi Polytechnic. In 1952, it started giving degrees after being affiliated with the University of Delhi. The institute has been under the Government of Delhi since 1963 and was affiliated with the University of Delhi from 1952 to 2009. In 2009, the college was given university status, thus changing its name to Delhi Technological University.

History

Delhi Polytechnic
The Delhi Polytechnic was visioned as a follow-up of the Wood and Abbott Committee of 1938. It was established as Delhi Polytechnic in 1941. The technical school was created to cater to the demands of Indian industries. At that time, Delhi Polytechnic offered courses in Arts, Architecture, Commerce, Engineering, Applied Science and Textiles. Walter William Wood, became the founder and Principal of Delhi Polytechnic. It became Delhi's first engineering college and was amongst the few engineering institutions in India set up before independence.

The National Diploma awarded by Delhi Polytechnic was considered an equivalent to the B.E. Degree by the then [Bachelor of Technology]. The college was affiliated with the University of Delhi in 1952 and started formal degree-level programmes.

Delhi College of Engineering 
Up till 1962, the college was under the direct control of the Ministry of Education, Government of India. In 1963, Delhi Polytechnic was taken over by the then Delhi Administration and Chief Commissioner Delhi was the ex-officio chairman of the college. It later became a college of the Union Territory of Delhi. In 1963, the Department of Arts became the College of Arts and the Department of Commerce & Business Administration was converted to several institutes of Commerce & Secretarial Practices. The fragmentation of Delhi Polytechnic ultimately left behind an engineering institute alone. In 1962, the college was affiliated with University of Delhi. In 1965, the Delhi Polytechnic was renamed as Delhi College of Engineering and became the first engineering college of Delhi, Now it is called Delhi technological university.

B.E. degree course in Production & Industrial Engineering was started in 1988 while the B.E. degree course in Computer Engineering was started in 1989. B.E. degree-level courses were started in Polymer Science & Chemical Technology and Environment Engineering in 1998. Information technology played a vital role during this era and the beginning of the new millennium witnessed the introduction of a B.E. in Information Technology in 2002. B.E. in Bio-Technology was introduced from the academic session 2004–2005.

The Department of Architecture of the Delhi College of Engineering became the School of Planning and Architecture, now a Deemed University and Institution of National importance. The Department of Arts and Sculpture became the College of Arts and the Departments of Chemical Technology and Textile Technology were shifted out en-block to mark the beginning of the IIT Delhi at its new campus at Hauz Khas. The Department of Commerce was later abolished and the Faculty of Management Studies of the University of Delhi was established by Prof. A. Das Gupta, of DCE.  Delhi Administration established the Delhi Institute of Technology (Presently Netaji Subhas University of Technology) in 1985 and the new college was established under the patronage of the Delhi College of Engineering. DCE shared its campus with NSIT at Kashmiri Gate campus, although later, NSIT was shifted to Dwarka as a follow-up of the Wood and Abott Committee of 1938. Delhi College of Engineering is thus the mother institution of several national institutes including Indian Institute of Technology Delhi, Netaji Subhas Institute of Technology, School of Planning and Architecture, Delhi, College of Art, Delhi and Faculty of Management Studies.

DCE-DTU Reconstitution and related protests in 2009–10
In July 2009, Delhi College of Engineering was upgraded to a state university from being a college under a central university and renamed Delhi Technological University (DTU), through the Delhi Technological University Bill, 2009. P. B. Sharma was nominated as the university's first Vice-Chancellor. The move was met with student protests over the erosion of the DCE brand (due to being downgraded from being part of a central university to a state university) and the reduction in the supposed value of their degree. which culminated to a face-off in March 2010, with the students boycotting the mid-semester exams, and demanding reconsideration of the change and replacement of the VC. However, the Chief Minister of Delhi, Sheila Dikshit informed the students that the change will not be reconsidered, and by the end of March the protest dwindled down, with the students taking their exams. In April 2010 Times City reported that the government will be willing to change the name to "DCE Technological University" (DCE TU), however,  the university name remains unchanged.

Campus

Delhi Technological University (Delhi College of Engineering) operated from the Kashmiri Gate campus in the heart of Old Delhi until 1989, when construction began at the New Campus at Bawana Road in May. Moving operations from Kashmiri Gate to the new 164 acres at Bawana Road began in 1995, and the new campus formally started classes for all four years of study starting in 1999.

The new DTU campus is well connected by road. Facilities include a library, a computer centre, a sports complex, eight boys' hostels, six girls' hostels, and a married couples' hostel. The campus has residential facilities for faculty and staff. The campus has an auditorium and two open-air theatres out of which one is called the OAT (Open-air Theatre) and the other is called the Mini OAT (Mini open-air theatre).

In 2010, the DTU came up with a plan to make the campus environment friendly which included, barring entry of vehicles on the campus, generation of one-third of the energy from alternative sources and designing new buildings as per the "green architecture concept".

DTU opened up a campus in Vivek Vihar, East Delhi named "University School of Management and Entrepreneurship (USME)" in 2017. The new campus offers management courses for graduation and post-graduation. Currently, the USME, east campus of DTU offers courses in MBA, MBA business analytics, BBA, and BA in economics.
USME offers 60 seats for MBA students and 30 seats for the MBA business analytics program.
Admission to MBA is decided by CAT score and further by rigorous group discussion and personal interviews. Moreover, there are 120 seats for BBA and BA (hons) Economics each. Admission to the courses is merit-based.

Academics

Academic programmes
DTU offers courses towards Bachelor of Technology (B.Tech.), Bachelor of Technology (B.Tech. Evening), Bachelor of Arts (Hons.), Bachelor of Design (B.Des), Master of Technology (MTech), Master of Science (MSc), Doctor of Philosophy (PhD), Master of Business Administration (M.B.A.) and Bachelor of Business Administration (B.B.A.).

Admissions
The admission towards a full-time Bachelor of Technology degree in DTU is through the Joint Admission Counselling Delhi (JAC-Delhi) process, based on All India Rank (AIR) secured in the Joint Entrance Examination – Main examination.

Admission of foreign students to DTU is through the Direct Admission of Students Abroad (DASA) scheme. Admission to the BTech (Lateral Entry) programme at DTU is based on marks secured by the candidates in the State Diploma Examination. Admissions to the evening studies programme (part-time course) is based on a Common Entrance Examination.

Admission towards a postgraduate degree at DTU is based on performance in the Graduate Aptitude Test in Engineering (GATE) qualifying exam. If two or more candidates have the same GATE score, the hen percentage in qualifying undergraduate courses shall decide the merit. No separate test or interview is conducted by the university. However, for the NRIs, Foreign Nationals and Persons of Indian Origin (PIOs) the admission is made on the basis of merit/score in Graduate Record Examination (GRE). The medium of instruction for all the courses at the university is English.

Admissions to the Bachelor of Design program at DTU are taken based on the UCEED score.

Admissionston MBA program at DTU is based on the Common Admission Test (CAT) exam, followed by a group discussion and an interview.

Scholarships and awards
Scholarships at DTU are available for students beginning their first year at the college, which are awarded based on their performance in subjects. Another award is given to two final year students based on merit, sponsoring their tuition to pursue MBA at the Raj Soin College of Business, Wright State University.

Rankings 

Internationally, Delhi Technological University was ranked 800–1000 in the world and 201–250 in Asia by the Times Higher Education World University Rankings of 2021 and 301–350 among Emerging Economies University Rankings in 2020.

Among engineering colleges, Delhi Technological University was ranked 1st by Times Engineering Rankings 2020, 9th by Outlook India in 2020. It was ranked 9th among colleges by India Today in 2020. The National Institutional Ranking Framework (NIRF) ranked it 36th in the engineering ranking of 2020.

Research
Students at DTU participate in projects such as design and development of a Formula SAE car, Unmanned Ground Vehicle (UGV DTU), SAE Mini Baja, ASME HPV, Hybrid Car, solar car, unmanned aerial vehicles, innovative embedded devices appreciated worldwide and setting up a plant for manufacturing Biodiesel.

Pioneered by the Defianz Racing team participating in the Formula Student competition, many student teams collaborate with universities from other countries and actively participate in international and national competitions. The college also came up with the development of a Personalised Mover – Mitra. Delhi College of Engineering is one of the TIFAC COREs (Technology Information, Forecasting & Assessment Council's Centres Of Relevance & Excellence) in Fiber Optics and Optical Communication. Also, Students of Delhi College of Engineering have made it top-15 Worldwide slots in the Microsoft Imagine Cup 2007 and 2008.

The technical team UAS-DTU has been exceptionally successful, in designing and building a prototype UAV, the Aarush X-1 with funding and mentorship from Lockheed Martin, USA. It also stood third in the AUVSI Student Unmanned Air System (SUAS) Competition,2012. The team has developed several prototype UAVs and expands its UAV count each year.

The solar car team, DTU Solaris was the first solar electric vehicle team in the country to have developed a two-seater passenger solar electric vehicle Arka in 2012. Its previous design – Avenir won the Most Economical Car Award in WSC 2011.

The campus at DTU has been proposed as one of the sites for the Delhi Government's plan of creating Delhi a Research and IT hub. A Knowledge Park at DTU has been set up as part of better infrastructure for Delhi.

DTU had been selected by Intel Technology Pvt. Ltd. to join Planet Lab Consortium which has the world's top universities and industrial research labs like Princeton University, University of Washington and NEC Labs as its members.

DTU organises various events/conferences/seminars throughout the year so that students from other Engineering institutes/organisations can also get benefited. Societies like ASME, SAE, IEEE, IET, MACS etc. frequently organise such events.

The largest waste-to-energy plant in any educational institution in North India is operational in DTU. The university is now building a sewage treatment plant on its 164-acre campus in Rohini, Delhi.

Team DTU Super mileage took part in Shell Eco-marathon, part of the inaugural Make the Future India festival in Chennai, held at the Madras Motor Race Track. In the Urban Concept internal combustion engine category, they clocked 154kpl in their vehicle. A total of 20 teams participated in the event, under two categories: Prototype (futuristic vehicles with incredible aerodynamics) and Urban Concept (conventional, roadworthy, energy-efficient vehicles aimed at meeting the real-life needs of drivers).

UAS-DTU won the first spot for the ‘Flying Formation Challenge’ at the Drone Olympics the biennial Aero India Show 2019. UAS-DTU also received prize money of Rs. 5 lakh including a developmental kit from Lockheed Martin and would further be trained for the AlphaPilot, an open innovation challenge in the US. They also exhibited a stall under the R&D Department of the Indian Air Force (IAF).

Student life

Hostel
DTU now has accommodation facilities for 1,105 girls and 1,600. Two new hostels were inaugurated in July 2022. The hostels have the facility of common rooms and gymnasium, The hostels subscribe to the latest magazines and newspapers for the residents. It is fully Wi-Fi and LAN-enabled.

Cultural events

DTU organises its own cultural and academic festivals. While the cultural festivals are a break from studies and comprise events such as music concerts and fashion shows, the academic festivals form a common platform for students and academicians across the country to meet and showcase research.

The cultural festival of DTU, Engifest is held every year in February. Engifest plays host to a variety of events like star night, rock shows, plays, dances, drag shows and others. In the past Engifest has been celebrated by likes of Euphoria, Lagori, Parikrama, and Indian Ocean, and through performances by renowned artistes like Amit Trivedi, Sidhu Moose Wala, Raftaar, Sunidhi Chauhan, Divine, Nucleya, Mohit Chauhan, Vishal, Shekhar etc.
 The fest season of the university begins in January and ends in March. Yuvaan, Literature & Film Festival (YLFF) is the first fest of the festive season, scheduled in the third week of January. Followed by the TechFest Invictus & the Cultural Fest, Engifest in the first and second week of February respectively. March experiences the Sports Fest, Aahvaan.

E-Summit is an event aimed to advocate entrepreneurship among students, with leadership lectures and panel discussions involving various stalwarts from the industry. It is conducted by the Entrepreneurship Development Cell of DTU, generally in February.

Resonance is a collage of assorted literary and managerial events and serves as a stage for showcasing the talents of students in fields other than science and engineering. The arena is the annual Sports Meet of the Delhi College of Engineering, and Virasat is the name for a host of cultural events organised by SPIC MACAY. Pratibimb is the dramatics club of DTU.

Excelsior is a fest organised by the Society of Robotics, DTU (SR-DTU).

DTU was also hosted at the 2015 and 2018 ASME's International Human Powered Vehicle Challenge India.

DTU also annually host TEDx talks since 2015 called "TEDxDTU". Since its conception, it has had a line-up of speakers which include Karan Wahi, Akasa Singh, Ankur Warikoo and Kaustubh Radkar.

2019–20 Online End-Term Examination Protests
DTU saw online protests in June–July 2020 amid the decision of the administration to conduct AI-proctored online end-term examinations amidst the COVID-19 pandemic. The protests saw #cancelDTUexams trend on Twitter for over 2 weeks with articles in media outlets such as  Education Times, Navbharat Times, Hindustan Times, India TV, and Careers 360. Students also came out with online petitions to voice their concerns.
 
Students have cited that conducting exams of intermediate semesters is a clear violation of UGC guidelines. Other reasons cited by students are lack of resources, incomplete syllabus after lockdown, internships & skill development courses, mental stress (many have not even stepped out of their house for months now due to COVID-19), online exams not being conducted by top engineering institutes like IITs, for cancellation of exams. Students also claim that when the university already has the result of past semesters, internal assessment, mid-term examination then why the provisional result should be declared on that basis and those who are not satisfied can appear later. The credibility of online examinations is debatable, students claimed.
 
As per an article in Navbharat Times, the Vice Chancellor of DTU Prof Yogesh Singh claimed that if students make up their mind for the exam they will provide them with all resources. This claim was further disputed by the students who said that the university was not providing them with any resources upon being approached and was rather asking them to come to the campus and appear for the exams which are not at all feasible seeing the rising number of COVID-19 cases in the capital.
 
The Controller of Examination has claimed to the Education Times that the majority of students want to appear in the online examination, a claim which further fueled the protests as students claimed that it was completely baseless. 
 
The protests finally ended on 11 July 2020 with the press release of the Deputy CM cancelling all exams at the n State Universities of Delhi.
 
On 14 July 2020, more than 3 days after the press release of the Govt of NCT of Delhi, the DTU administration finally released the official notification confirming the cancellation. Even this delay in the official notice lead to student outrage on social media for the mentioned period.

2020 Annual Fee Protests
The DTU administration released a notice dated 24 July 2020 via the official site on 30 July 2020 demanding hefty annual fees of INR 1,90,000 to be paid just within 5 days. The notice has a punitive clause that after 5 August students will have to bear hefty fines and after 27 August their names may be struck off from the university records.

The move has seen massive student protests with widespread national media coverage. Students sighted that for the last 4 months they have not utilized any of the college infrastructure and other amenities and the next session being online will not utilize the same due to the ongoing pandemic of COVID-19. DTU is primarily an undergraduate institute with more than 80% of students pursuing UG courses like B.Tech. and the majority of students coming from humble backgrounds, it is almost impossible for them to pay such a hefty fee right now within 5 days of which three are bank holidays, especially due to the adverse effects the pandemic has had on their economic condition.
The fee structure of INR 1,90,000 for the B.Tech. course has more than 40% charges on Miscellaneous Heads in the name of facilities and services which the students are not utilizing. Hence, the students are being asked to pay for something they have not availed of.
The Govt of NCT of Delhi passed an order on 15 April 2020 asking schools govt or private in the capital to only charge tuition fees. Then why is the same not application higher education govt institutes like DTU?
The protests saw the #dtufeesrelaxation trend on Twitter for a week.

Anoop Lather, Public Relations Officer of DTU in a statement to The Indian Express on 1 August said that the expenses of the university remain the same as they were before the pandemic and students who have problems paying can submit an application which shall be considered on the case-to-case basis. The statement further received backlash from the students who said that the university administration was not responding to any of their emails and letters for concession and payment in instalments and further it would be insane to suggest that the expenses of the university functioning via free online platforms like Google Meet could remain the same as before. Students also claimed that many other government institutes like IIT Kharagpur and NIT Patna had already given concessions to students on miscellaneous heads, and none were demanding one-time annual fee payments.

After getting no positive response from the Govt of NCT of Delhi and the university administration by the fee payment deadline of 5 August, the students wrote an open letter to LG of Delhi Anil Baijal who is also the Chancellor of the University on 6 August 2020 asking him to take action against the Vice Chancellor of DTU Prof Yogesh Singh for displaying yet again an apathetic attitude towards the concerns of students and their families who are already under severe economic and mental stress amid the pandemic. They also alleged that the university administration intimidated some Class Representatives via the Office of the Vice Chancellor to either pay the fee or face disciplinary action. NSUI also wrote to the LG asking him to take back the annual fee notice. On 7 August, some students organized a protest march in the DTU campus. Protesters claimed that no one from m DTU administration met them on the given day. TOI claimed that the university did not respond to any of its calls on the same day.

Students also claimed that the university was using the Training and Placement Department to intimidate them by asking them to pay their fees immediately, or else they would not be allowed to sit for placements for the year 2020–2021 

On 8 August, some students met BJP Delhi president Adesh Kumar Gupta who then wrote to the CM Arvind Kejriwal asking him to intervene in the maturation at the request of the students.

As of 8 August, st more than 50of % of students have still not paid the annual fee as per the PRO of DTU. Until 9 August, the  DTU admin has refused to budge any concessions and relaxations to the student.

As of now, the office of LG has forwarded the matter to the  Directorate of Training and Technical Education for further action as per the complaint filed by DTU students.

Notable alumni

References

External links

 
Engineering colleges in Delhi
Educational institutions established in 1941
All India Council for Technical Education
1941 establishments in India